Amichai Chasson (also Amichai Hasson, Hebrew: עמיחי חסון; born 1987) is an Israeli poet, curator and filmmaker.

Biography
Amichai Chasson born in Ramat Gan, Israel in 1987 into an Orthodox Jewish family. His father from Tripoli, Libya, and his mother (granddaughter of Samuel S. Bloom) from New York City, United States. Chasson attended state-religious schools in Bnei Brak, and after high school he moved to the hesder yeshiva in Yeshivat Otniel. He studied at the Sam Spiegel Film and Television School and the Mandel Leadership Institute in Jerusalem.He lives in Katamon neighborhood of Jerusalem with his wife Miriam Chasson (the daughter of Author Emuna Elon and Rabbi Binyamin Elon). the couple have two sons and a daughter.

Journalism and literary career
He has worked as a journalist and culture critic for the papers Makor Rishon and Maariv, and as a speechwriter for the President of Israel Reuven Rivlin. He is one of the editors of the poetry journal Meshiv Haruach; and is a broadcaster for the public radio channel Kan Tarbut – Israeli Public Broadcasting Corporation ("Hitbodedut," a weekly discussion show together with Yair Assulin). since 2015 Chasson artistic director and chief curator at Beit Avi Chai in Jerusalem.

His first book of poems, Talking with Home (Hebrew: מדבר עם הבית) was published in 2015 and won the Minister of Culture's prize that year.  In 2018, his second book, Bli ma (Hebrew: בלי מה), was published by the veteran Bialik Institute Press. His poems often deal with the tension between his religious faith and artistic sensibilities and stand on the border between cultures, identities, sources and places.

in 2018 Nechama Rivlin presented the First Lady's Prize, the Dr Gardner Simon Prize for Hebrew Poetry to Amichai Chasson for his book Bli ma, at a ceremony at the President's Residence In Jerusalem. A year later, the book was also on the shortlist of finalists for the Brenner Prize for Poetry.

He co-directed the documentary film ‘Footsteps in Jerusalem’ (a tribute to David Perlov, 2013). In 2018, he released the documentary film about the poet Avoth Yeshurun called Yeshurun in 6 Chapters (Hebrew: ישורון: 6 פרקי אבות) premiered in Docaviv International Documentary Film Festival. In addition, he has written and directed for a number of Film and TV Series, including The Winner ("Hamenatzeach") and Iron Dome ("Kipat Barzel").
In 2019 he participated in the Intellectual Incubator for Documentary Filmmakers at the Van Leer Jerusalem Institute. From 2021 he serves as a member of the Israel Film Council.

Awards and recognition 
 2015 – Israeli Culture Ministry awards for Literature
 2018 – Dr. Gardner Simon Prize for Hebrew Poetry
 2021 – Prime Minister's Prize for Hebrew Literary Works

Published works

Poetry
 2015 – Medaber eem ha bayit/Talking with Home (Even Hoshen Publishing)
 2018 – Bli Ma/Emptiness (Kvar Series, Bialik Institute)
 2022 – Shirim Al Saf/Liminal Poems (Kvar Series, Bialik Institute)

Edited books
 2019 – Man walks in the world: conversations with Abraham Joshua Heschel (Yedioth Sfarim Publishing)

Filmography

Director
 2013 – Footsteps in Jerusalem: a tribute to In Jerusalem (Documentary film)
 2016 – On the Six Day (graduation movie in Sam Spiegel Film School)
 2018 – Yeshurun in 6 Chapters (Documentary film)

Screenwriter
 2017 – Kipat Barzel (TV drama)
 2018 –  HaMenatzeah (TV drama)

Curated exhibitions
 2016 – Ronny Someck: Tow time Chai (exhibition and catalogue: curator and editor, Amichai Chasson), Beit Avi Chai, Jerusalem 
 2018 – Joel Kantor: Night Guard (exhibition and catalogue: curator and editor, Amichai Chasson), Beit Avi Chai, Jerusalem
 2019 – Emerging from the shadows: the photographs of Sarah Ayal (exhibition and catalogue: curator and editor, Amichai Chasson), Beit Avi Chai and The Knesset, Jerusalem
 2022 – Marek Yanai: On the Threshold (exhibition and catalogue: curator and editor, Amichai Chasson), Beit Avi Chai, Jerusalem
 2023 – Anatoli Kaplan: The Enchanted Artist (exhibition Curator and catalogue editor: David Rozenson, Amichai Chasson), Beit Avi Chai, Jerusalem

References

External links

 Poet Amichai Chasson in Poetry International Web
 Poems by Amichai Chasson in World Literature Today
 Amichai Chasson’s “Rami Levy in Talpiot”, Israel in Translation – TLV1 Podcasts
  Amichai Chasson’s poem, “America" in Israel Story
 Gili Izikovich, Amichai Chasson’s new poetry collection comes out at a particularly fraught moment for Israeli society, Haaretz December 29, 2022

Hebrew-language poets
21st-century Israeli poets
Israeli literary critics
1987 births
Living people
Israeli male poets
Israeli journalists
Israeli documentary filmmakers
Israeli film directors
Israeli male screenwriters
Recipients of Prime Minister's Prize for Hebrew Literary Works
People from Jerusalem